James Anthony Ell (15 September 1915 – 8 July 2007) was a New Zealand cricketer who played first-class cricket for Wellington from 1933 to 1946.

Jimmy Ell appeared in 28 first-class matches as a right-handed batsman, scoring 1185 runs, with a highest of 89. He scored 61, top-scoring in the second innings, in Wellington's narrow victory over the touring MCC in 1935-36. In a senior club match in Wellington in November 1945 he scored 291 in three and a quarter hours, setting a new individual record in Wellington cricket. 

The New Zealand cricket historian Don Neely described Ell as "a brilliant stylist with a hint of batting genius who never really developed into the great player he could have been". Ell admitted that his impatience often led to his dismissal.

Ell was born in Lower Hutt and educated at Johnsonville School and Wellington Technical College. He worked as a commercial artist in Wellington. His first wife Hilda and his sister Agnes played Test cricket for New Zealand.

References

External links
 
 

1915 births
2007 deaths
People educated at Wellington High School, New Zealand
Cricketers from Lower Hutt
New Zealand cricketers
Wellington cricketers
North Island cricketers